Ethan Juan (born 8 November 1982) is a Taiwanese actor and model. He rose to prominence with the television series Fated to Love You (2008). Juan won the Best Actor award at the 47th Golden Horse Awards for his role in Monga in 2010.

Early life

Juan grew up in Taichung, Taiwan, with ancestral roots in Zhejiang. He comes from a military family: his father is a soldier, his mother is a military nurse, and his younger brother is an air force pilot. As a competitive swimmer in his early years, Juan's numerous achievements and awards (including first place at the Taichung City Duathlon) gained him admission into the highly prestigious National Teaching First Senior High School. However, owing to his rebellious streak as a teenager, he eventually dropped out; only graduating after numerous transfers in five different high schools. Thereafter, he held several part-time jobs.

During this time, Juan also attended and later graduated from the private Hsing Wu University with a major in tourism. It was in 2002 when he accompanied a friend to an audition that he was discovered by the talent agency and began his first showbiz career starring in Penny Tai's music video for "Once Fell In Love" (愛過). Juan was a full-time model before turning to mainstream acting.

Career
Juan began his career in entertainment industry with Catwalk Modelling Agency. As a model, he starred in the music videos of several popular artists, including but not limited to Stefanie Sun, A-Mei and S.H.E. He made his debut in the 2004 television series Michael the Archangel. Subsequently, Juan took on other dramas such as Green Forest, My Home (2005) and Summer x Summer (2006).

However, despite proving to be a promising actor, Juan's career failed to take off. It was only after he starred in the 2008 drama, Fated to Love You that he managed to achieve breakthrough. Fated to Love You was the highest rated Taiwanese idol drama. 
This was followed by another hit drama, My Queen in 2009.

Marking another breakthrough in his career, Juan won the Best Leading Actor award at the 47th Golden Horse Awards for his role in the gangster film Monga in 2010. He subsequently made a name for himself in film, starring in romance film Love (2012) by Monga director Doze Niu and wuxia film The Guillotines by Andrew Lau.

Post military, Juan reunited again Monga director Doze Niu in the military film Paradise in Service (2014), which earned him a nomination at the Asian Film Awards for Best Actor.

In 2017, Juan returned to the small screen with the tomb-raiding drama The Weasel Grave, eight years after his previous drama My Queen in 2009. The same year, played the role of a psychotic killer in the crime suspense film The Liquidator.

In 2018, Juan starred in the fantasy adventure drama Legend of Fuyao alongside Yang Mi.

Personal life
Juan served one year of alternative service in lieu of military service due to his flat feet (a recognized medical condition) in Taiwan, and was discharged on January 11, 2013. 
During his post at the Ministry of Education in New Taipei City, he received a monthly salary of NT$9,955.

After his release from military service, his long-term contract expired with Catwalk. On 5 March 2013, Juan announced that he will be opening a talent management agency together with Doze Niu and Lee Lieh).

Filmography

Film

Television series

Variety show

Discography

Awards and nominations

References

External links

1982 births
Living people
Taiwanese male models
Taiwanese male film actors
Taiwanese male television actors
Male actors from Taichung
21st-century Taiwanese male actors